PUB, Singapore’s national water agency (PUB) is a statutory board under the Ministry of Sustainability and the Environment of the Government of Singapore responsible for ensuring a sustainable and efficient water supply in Singapore. 

PUB regulates and oversees the country's entire water supply system, which comprises the water catchment systems, drainage systems, water works, pipeline network, water reclamation plants and sewage systems. In April 2020, PUB was also appointed Singapore's National Coastal Protection Agency.

The nation's demand for water is about  a day, with homes and non-domestic sectors consumption forming 45% and 55% of the demand respectively, and expected to double by 2060. PUB is set to meet 80% of this demand through its NEWater and desalination technologies.

PUB's watershed management and treatment processes has ensured a continuous supply of clean and quality water for Singaporeans over the last four decades. The nation's clean and drinkable 'tap water' across the island exceeds the drinking water standards set by the World Health Organization. Singapore is named the top Asian city in water sustainability development in 2015, with the nation boasting the highest drinking water and sanitation standards in the region.

History

The PUB is the statutory board of then Ministry of the Environment and Water Resources responsible for acquiring, producing, disseminating and reclaiming water to ensure a sustainable and efficient water supply for Singapore. It is also known as the National Water Agency.

During the colonial period and up to 1961, the supply of water in Singapore was managed by the Municipal Water Department under the guidance of the Municipal Engineer. Three reservoirs in Singapore are named after notable Municipal Engineers James MacRitchie, Robert Peirce (engineer) and David J. Murnane.

The idea of a Public Utilities Board was first introduced in 1961 when industrialisation was driving up the country's demand for power. However, it was only until 1 May 1963 that the statutory board came into force.

Prior to its reconstitution as the National Water Agency on 1 April 2001, the PUB was previously under the Ministry of Trade and Industry where it facilitated the supply of electricity, water and gas in Singapore. Today, the PUB is solely in charge of water supplies with the management and control of electricity and gas transferred to the Energy Market Authority (EMA).

In 2003 and 2005, the PUB launched the NEWater project and the desalinated water treatment project respectively. This further diversifies the water supply in Singapore to four main sources: local catchment water, imported water, NEWater and desalinated water. They form the Four National Taps.

Operations
Singapore faces a problem of water shortage with its limited rainfall and land area. Long-term water security has been one of the key priorities of the government of Singapore. As the national water agency, PUB takes control of the entire water chain. From the collection of rainwater to water reclamation, the four main processes involved are collection, production, distribution and reclamation.

In the collection process, rainwater is collected through a network of rivers, drains and canals and stored in the reservoirs before undergoing treatment for drinking water purposes. The reservoirs are equipped with pipelines that interlink the collection ponds to manage excess water by controlling the water level in each reservoir. In 2011, rainwater can be collected on two-thirds of Singapore's land surface.

In the production process, raw water from the reservoirs is piped to the waterworks to be treated with chemical coagulation, rapid gravity filtration and chlorine disinfection. These procedures remove harmful particles and suspended particulate matters from the raw water, making them safe for consumption. The filtered water is stored in water tanks for water quality checks before being distributed to the people.

Used water is collected through a sewerage system and recycled via water reclamation plants in the reclamation process. The water is purified using the NEWater technology. With the development of the deep tunnel sewerage system (DTSS) aimed for completion in 2022, sewage will be conveniently transported to the three existing water reclamation plants for treatment.

Four National Taps
Compelled for the need for self-reliance and sustainability, PUB has invested and developed a dynamic, efficient and sustainable water supply system stemming from four different sources, also known as the Four National Taps. The Four National Taps form the backbone of PUB's, and in turn Singapore's, water management strategy.

Local catchment water

Singapore's rainwater is collected and stored in 17 reservoirs using an extensive network of drains, rivers and canals. The 17 reservoirs for rainwater collection are Pandan Reservoir, Kranji Reservoir, Jurong Lake, MacRitchie Reservoir, Upper Peirce Reservoir, Lower Peirce Reservoir, Bedok Reservoir, Upper Seletar Reservoir , Lower Seletar Reservoir, Poyan Reservoir, Murai Reservoir, Tengeh Reservoir, Sarimbun Reservoir, Pulau Tekong Reservoir, Marina Reservoir, Serangoon Reservoir and Punggol Reservoir.

PUB makes use of online sensors and sampling methods to monitor the quality of raw water it is treating.

Imported water

Singapore currently imports nearly 40 percent of its 300-million-gallon daily demand from its neighbor, Malaysia, through the Johor-Singapore Causeway water pipes. In 2061, the remaining contracts between both countries will expire. To lessen its reliance on Malaysia, Singapore introduced new ways of water sources to meet Singapore's demand for water. By diversifying Singapore' s water supply, Singapore was successful in building up a robust water system.

NEWater
NEWater is a term invented by PUB. It is a high-quality reclaimed water which is purified using advanced membrane and ultraviolet technologies. It is scientifically tested to have surpassed the World Health Organization's requirements for safe drinking water. In 2021, NEWater is able to meet 40% of Singapore's need and demand for water.

Despite NEWater tested safe for portable use, Singapore authority decided to blend NEWater with raw reservoir water so that it will undergo the same conventional water treatment process. The process would re-introduce trace minerals that had been removed during the production of NEWater and provide additional safety precaution beyond the advanced technologies used to produce NEWater.

Desalinated water
Desalinated water is Singapore's fourth National Tap. It was first introduced in September 2005, with the first SingSpring Desalination Plant located in Tuas. The plant can produce 30 million gallons of water a day (136, 000 cubic meters) and is one of the region's largest seawater reverse-osmosis plants. During pretreatment process, suspended particles in the sea water is removed. The water then undergoes reverse osmosis; the same technology used in the production of NEWater. The pure desalinated water is then blended with treated water before it is supplied to homes and industries. Today, with the addition of a second and larger desalination plant known as the Tuaspring Desalination Plant, desalinated water can meet up to 25% of Singapore's current water demand.

Outstanding Initiatives

Water Wally

Launched and unveiled on 4 August 2005, Water Wally is the official mascot for PUB. Through a lively and interactive approach, Water Wally aims to educate the public about water preservation and sustainable usage.

PUB has embarked on several initiatives involving Water Wally, leveraging on its appeal to reach out to the general public and more specifically, schools.

My Take on Water
“My Take on Water" was a photo / video competition organised by PUB in 2013 in lieu of its 50th anniversary. This event was held over a period of 5 months in conjunction with the World Water Day celebration. With a top prize of $5,000, the competition served to incentivise the public to share and reminisce the positive impacts water has on their lives. PUB hoped to reinforce to the public the privileges of having readily clean water available for use and prompt them in cherishing and appreciating Singapore's water.

Shower Dance
The shower dance is an initiative targeted at primary schools. By 2013, Water Wally had visited and imparted the dance moves to 185 primary schools. By leveraging on the appeal of mascot Water Wally, PUB was able to garner the interest and support of primary school students. These students were tasked to monitor and record their shower timings in an activity booklet issued to them. They were also given the chance to influence and educate their parents and neighbours regarding water conservation.

Active, Beautiful, Clean (ABC) Waters programme

The ABC programme is a long term initiative started in 2006, targeted at transforming Singapore's water bodies into beautiful and iconic symbols of Singapore's water landscapes. It strives to beautify and bring Singaporeans in closer proximity to water such that they will better appreciate and cherish water as a scarce resource.

In the development of this programme, PUB seeks the collaboration and advice from the 3P sectors of public, privately held company and people to help them in building a firm relationship with water and develop a joint responsibility for it. PUB also plans to utilize this channel to create awareness of the concept and application of its programmes amongst industry experts in hope to attract and train professionals to design and implement this project. Thus far, PUB has identified more than 100 potential development regions with 27 already in progress. PUB's extensive and lucrative proposal has won Singapore the Utility Performance Initiative of the Year at the Global Water Awards 2013 presented at the Global Water Summit in Seville, Spain.

Water efficiency management plan

Introduced in 2010, the Water Efficiency Management Plan (WEMP) is an initiative introduced by PUB to aid businesses in the efficient management of water usage. It primarily serves to provide a clear breakdown of water usage, identify potential areas for improvement and draft a strategy to improve business operational processes.

From 2015, bulk consumers of water, with businesses using more than 60000 cubic metres of water, will be required to install water meters to monitor water usage. These businesses will also have to submit their WEMP to PUB annually for the next 3 years to ensure adherence to requirement.

Corporate social responsibility
Apart from ensuring an efficient and sustainable water management network, PUB also integrates the values of giving and sharing into its business practices and philosophy. PUB advocates being responsible and caring toward both society and the environment, exemplified through its Corporate Social Responsibility (CSR) framework.

Corporate philanthropy
PUB has been awarded the highest honour Pinnacle Award in 2007 in recognition for its loyal and continued commitment to Community Chest. PUB's employees have been supporting the virtue of corporate philanthropy by consistently and steadily contributing to the Share Programme under the Community Chest since 1986.

PUB also actively contributes to the Vertical Challenge, an annual fundraising event jointly organised by the Ministry of the Environment and Water Resources and PUB. Through passionate participation and benevolent monetary contributions, PUB advocates the spirit and virtue of giving by playing their part in raising funds for beneficiaries of the events.

Community volunteering
PUB also engages in the spirit of volunteering, by collaborating with Community Development Councils (CDCs) and volunteers. PUB educates disadvantaged families on water saving habits and installs water efficient gadgets in the homes of these families to aid them in this cause. This initiative has greatly helped in reducing the utility usage by these families.

PUB also centralizes its volunteering approach on the importance of building relationships. Throughout 2004 to 2007, PUB has collaborated with foundations like the Singapore Children's Society and the Peace Connect Neighbourhood Link in activities like home visits, distributing rations and organizing outings for children.

Responsible business practices
PUB adopts a dual faceted approach in its corporate operations and daily activities, believing in responsibility to the environment and its owners. PUB's responsibility toward environmental conservation through its green office practices has allowed for substantial and efficient conservation of resources, thereby winning the Green Office Label in 2007 awarded by the Singapore Environment Council.

PUB has also devised the OHSAS 18801 Occupational Health and Safety Management System centric around health, safety, security and emergency risks and managements. Through this, PUB puts in place plans to tackle and mitigate potential health and safety hazards that might affect their employees.

International responsibility
PUB takes on a holistic responsibility towards safe and efficient water management. PUB, having a successful and professional management system, is keen to share and promotes safe techniques of managing drinking water to other key global players to expand its reach and influence globally. It frequently organises study excursions and seminars to promote its professional water management strategies with world-renowned organisations such as UNESCO, UNEP, UN-HABITAT, Asian Development Bank and World Bank. PUB also offers its Waterhub as the Asia Pacific Regional Knowledge Hub for open-sharing of management strategies and facilities to developing countries.

Unions
Employees of Public Utilities Board are represented by the Public Utilities Board Employees' Union, a House Union affiliated to the National Trades Union Congress.

International awards and achievements

Official mascot

Water Wally is the official mascot for PUB. It is blue in colour and takes the form of a water droplet. It helps to spread messages about water preservation and proper water usage to the public in a lively and interactive way. PUB hopes that it will reach out to the masses, especially the young, and encourage everyone to play their part in water sustainability by conserving water and keeping the waterways clean.

See also
Water supply and sanitation in Singapore
List of dams and reservoirs in Singapore
Ministry of the Environment and Water Resources
Statutory boards of Singapore
Singapore International Water Week
Floods in Singapore

References

External links
 
Ministry of the Environment and Water Resources – Official site
NEWater – Official site

2001 establishments in Singapore
Government agencies established in 2001
Statutory boards of the Singapore Government
Regulation in Singapore
Water supply and sanitation in Singapore